Stack Rock Fort is a fort built on a small island in the Milford Haven Waterway, Pembrokeshire. A 3-gun fort was built between 1850 and 1852, and then upgraded in 1859 with a new building that completely encased the original gun tower. It is now a Grade II* listed building and a Scheduled Monument (registered SAM number PE334).

History
A fortification at Stack Rock was first proposed by Thomas Cromwell in 1539 to protect the waterway, although this would not actually come to fruition at the time. Similar proposals were made in 1748 when Lewis Morris carried out a survey of Milford Haven, reporting on shipwrecks and navigation and recommending that a small fort be built here. Another survey followed in 1817. The Royal Dockyard at Pembroke Dock was felt to be in need of defence from the sea,  and in 1850 construction commenced, being completed in 1852.

The fort was originally designed for two decks of artillery casemates, but only the first floor was completed and used as a gun deck.  The first floor accommodated a garrison of one officer and thirty men.  Disarmed in 1929, it was first placed on the market in 1932 and sold for £160. In 2005 it was sold once more for £150,000. 

Concerns over the security of a nearby LNG jetty were raised in 2013, following the discovery of potential trespasser activity.

The fort was sold again in 2020 to a private owner for an undisclosed amount. Land Registry records show that it was sold in January 2021 for £191,000 to a community interest company (CIC).

The fort
The fort housed three 32-pounder guns, as well as a single 12-pounder for protection of the walls of the dock. From 1859 to 1871, the armaments were changed to sixteen 10-inch and seven 9-inch RMLs, and these were changed again to four 12-pounder QF guns in 1902. A small number of men manned the fort during World War I and by this time, only two 12-pounder QF guns remained.

References

External links
 Official website
 Victorian Forts data sheet

Forts in Pembrokeshire
Grade II* listed buildings in Pembrokeshire
History of Pembrokeshire
Grade II* listed forts
Palmerston Forts
Forts in Wales